Garner is an unincorporated community in Knott County, Kentucky, United States. Garner had a post office, which closed on November 12, 2011; it still has its own ZIP code, 41817.

References

Unincorporated communities in Knott County, Kentucky
Unincorporated communities in Kentucky